Luigi di Savoia Duca degli Abruzzi  was an Italian  light cruiser, which served in the Regia Marina during World War II. After the war, she was retained by the Marina Militare and decommissioned in 1961. She was built by OTO at La Spezia and named after Prince Luigi Amedeo, Duke of the Abruzzi, an Italian explorer and Admiral of World War I.

Design

The armament was also increased by two extra 152 mm guns, triple turrets replaced twins in the "A" and "Y" positions thus making them the most heavily armed light cruisers of Italy during World War II. The machinery was also revised which led to these ships having a slightly slower maximum speed than their predecessors.

Career

World War II
The ship was completed in 1937 and formed the 8th Cruiser division with her sister ship . She fought in the following actions:
 Battle of Calabria, where she led a squadron of light cruisers which fired the first salvoes of the battle
 1 September 1940: Part of the fleet that attempted to intercept the convoy Hats
 Battle of Cape Matapan
 24 September 1941: Part of the fleet that attempted to intercept the convoy Halberd headed for Malta.

Damaged by an aircraft torpedo on 22 November 1941 but repaired, she was interned by the Allies after the Italian Armistice and later served with the Italian Co-Belligerent Navy in the South Atlantic on operations against potential German raiders.

Post war
After 1945, her torpedo launchers were removed and replaced by two 4 inch anti-aircraft guns. Since 1953 she was equipped with an AN/SPS-6 2D air search radar.

In late 1953, during the negotiations which ended in the handover of Trieste to Italy, the cruiser was transferred from Taranto to Venezia, in order to strengthen the Italian position at the bargaining table. Eventually, on 26 October 1954, Duca degli Abruzzi was the flagship of the Italian naval force which took possession of Trieste's port facilities. She served in the post war Marina Militare until 1961.

Notes

References
 
 

 

Duca degli Abruzzi-class cruisers
Ships built by OTO Melara
Ships built in La Spezia
1936 ships
World War II cruisers of Italy
Cold War cruisers of Italy